Zaïrite is a phosphate mineral with the chemical formula Bi(Fe3+,Al)3[(OH)6|(PO4)2]. The name was given from where it was locally discovered in Eta-Etu, Kivu, Congo (Zaïre) in 1975.

Properties
Zaïrite crystallizes in the trigonal crystal system, which means it contains three equal horizontal axes with angles of 120° between them.  The mineral has a trigonal-hexagonal scalenohedron shape. Zairite belongs to the uniaxial optical class. It means the light and vibrations passing through the mineral only has one direction it follows and it travels at the same speed.

Occurrence
The mineral was first described from the Eta-Etu district, northern Kivu Province, Democratic Republic of the Congo (then Zaire) usually in the weathering areas of quartz wolframite deposits where it occurs with native bismuth, bismutite, quartz and mica.  Zaïrite is found in granite pegmatites, which are igneous coarse-grained rocks. It has also been reported from Kreuzberg Mountain in Upper Palatinate, Bavaria, Germany.

References

External links

Aluminium minerals
Bismuth minerals
Iron(III) minerals
Phosphate minerals
Trigonal minerals
Minerals in space group 166
Crandallite group